Palmetto Electric Cooperative Inc. is a non-profit electric utility cooperative headquartered in Ridgeland, South Carolina. It has a membership of approximately 66,000 customers.

History
Palmetto Electric was formed in 1940 by a group of residents in response to the lack of service in rural areas by investor-owned utility companies. By 1942, the company began servicing Hampton County. Shortly thereafter, they began servicing Jasper County. In 1950, they energized the first lines to Hilton Head Island.

Leadership
Palmetto Electric Cooperative is governed by 12 trustees, six of whom reside in Beaufort County, three of whom reside in Hampton County, and three of whom reside in Jasper County. Board members serve terms of three years each.  As of January 2012, elected persons include:

Jeremiah E. Vaigneur, Chairman, Jasper County
C. Alex Ulmer, Vice Chairman, Beaufort County
Eunice F. Spilliards, Secretary-Treasurer, Jasper County

Service area
Palmetto Electric services southern Beaufort, Hampton, and Jasper counties.
There are offices located in the towns of Hampton, Hilton Head, Hardeeville, and Ridgeland.

Charity 
In 2017, Palmetto Electric donated $50,000 to the TCL's Criminal Justice Program towards their virtual weapons training system, which can be used by local law enforcement agencies to educate and improve the skills of law enforcement officers.

Affiliations
 Electric Cooperatives of South Carolina: provides legal services, public relations and advertising, employee training, and insurance to members.
 National Rural Electric Cooperative Association
 Palmetto Economic Development Corporation
 Touchstone Energy

Energy sources
Palmetto Electric receives 100% of its energy from Santee Cooper.

References

Electric cooperatives of the United States
Electric power companies of the United States
Energy infrastructure in South Carolina
Companies based in South Carolina
Hilton Head Island–Beaufort micropolitan area
American companies established in 1940 
Energy companies established in 1940
1940 establishments in South Carolina